Elias Alves da Silva (born 4 September 1981), known simply as Elias, is a Brazilian professional footballer who plays as a midfielder, most recently for Armenian club FC Yerevan.

He also held Portuguese citizenship, due to the many years spent in the country. He amassed Primeira Liga totals of 167 matches and eight goals during eight seasons, in representation of seven clubs.

Football career
Born in Montalvânia, Minas Gerais, Elias started playing professionally with lowly Grêmio Inhumense. He joined FC Porto in 2001, but played mostly for their reserves during his two-year stint; he appeared once for the first team, featuring the last 13 minutes of a 3–2 home win against Varzim S.C. on 17 May 2003 after taking the place of Clayton.

In the 2004–05 season, after a brief spell back in his country with Sport Club Corinthians Alagoano, Elias moved back to Portugal, successively representing in the Primeira Liga G.D. Estoril Praia, Gil Vicente FC, F.C. Paços de Ferreira, Vitória de Setúbal, U.D. Leiria and Portimonense SC. With Vitória he won the domestic League Cup, playing the entire penalty shootout win against Sporting CP and converting his attempt.

On 22 December 2011, Elias joined PFC Beroe Stara Zagora in Bulgaria on a free transfer, signing a one-and-a-half year contract. He made his league debut on 3 March of the following year, in a 0–3 away loss to PFC Ludogorets Razgrad.

On 2 April 2018, Elias was announced as player-coach of FC Vereya until end of the season, succeeding Blagomir Mitrev.

On 21 February 2020, the Football Federation of Armenia announced that FC Yerevan had withdrawn from the league due to financial and technical problems.

Honours
Porto
Primeira Liga: 2002–03

Corinthians Alagoano
Campeonato Alagoano: 2004

Vitória Setúbal
Taça da Liga: 2007–08

Beroe
Bulgarian Cup: 2012–13
Bulgarian Supercup: 2013

References

External links

1981 births
Living people
Brazilian footballers
Association football midfielders
Sport Club Corinthians Alagoano players
Primeira Liga players
Segunda Divisão players
FC Porto B players
FC Porto players
G.D. Estoril Praia players
Gil Vicente F.C. players
F.C. Paços de Ferreira players
Vitória F.C. players
U.D. Leiria players
Portimonense S.C. players
Cypriot First Division players
Ermis Aradippou FC players
First Professional Football League (Bulgaria) players
PFC Beroe Stara Zagora players
FC Vereya players
FC Haskovo players
Armenian Premier League players
FC Yerevan players
Brazilian expatriate footballers
Expatriate footballers in Portugal
Expatriate footballers in Cyprus
Expatriate footballers in Bulgaria
Expatriate footballers in Armenia
Brazilian expatriate sportspeople in Portugal
Brazilian expatriate sportspeople in Cyprus
Brazilian expatriate sportspeople in Bulgaria
Brazilian football managers
Brazilian expatriate football managers
Expatriate football managers in Bulgaria